Scopula klaphecki is a moth of the family Geometridae. It was described by Prout in 1922. It is endemic to China.

References

Moths described in 1922
klaphecki
Moths of Asia
Taxa named by Louis Beethoven Prout